You Are My Sunshine (literally: "You are my destiny") is a 2005 South Korean film written and directed by Park Jin-pyo, and starring Jeon Do-yeon. It was released in Korea on 23 September 2005.

The official English title is named after the Jimmie Davis song "You Are My Sunshine," which is used on the soundtrack.

Plot 
Seok-joong, a farmer in his mid thirties, is desperate to find a wife and settle down. After backing out of a scheme to set him up with a Filipino bride, he falls head over heels in love with a local dabang delivery girl, Eun-ha, and starts showering her with gifts. Although Eun-ha is initially unimpressed, she is eventually won over by his kindhearted nature, and the two get married. The couple's marital bliss is short lived, however, as Eun-ha tests positive for HIV/AIDS, and is then tracked down by her abusive ex-husband, which forces her to run away and fall back into prostitution.

Cast 
 Jeon Do-yeon as Eun-ha
 Na Moon-hee as Seok-joong's mother
 Hwang Jung-min as Seok-joong
 Ryu Seung-soo as Chul-kyu
 Seo Joo-hee as Kyu-ri
 Jeong Yu-seok as Chun-soo
 Yoon Je-moon as Jae-ho
 Go Soo-hee as Hwang Yu-sun
 Kim Sang-ho as Kim Kyung-bae
 Moon Won-joo as Mr. Gook
 Kim Boo-seon as Kim Yeo-in

Reception
You Are My Sunshine was the ninth most successful domestic film of the year, selling 3,051,134 tickets nationwide, and grossing . It also became the best-selling Korean melodrama film of all time, before its record was surpassed by Maundy Thursday a year later.

Awards and nominations
2005 Chunsa Film Art Awards
 Best Actress - Jeon Do-yeon

2005 Busan Film Critics Awards
 Best Supporting Actress - Na Moon-hee

2005 Blue Dragon Film Awards
 Best Director - Park Jin-pyo
 Best Actor - Hwang Jung-min
 Nomination - Best Film
 Nomination - Best Actress - Jeon Do-yeon
 Nomination - Best Supporting Actress - Na Moon-hee
 Nomination - Best Screenplay - Park Jin-pyo
 Nomination - Best Music - Bang Jun-seok

2005 Korean Film Awards
 Best Actor - Hwang Jung-min
 Best Actress - Jeon Do-yeon
 Nomination - Best Film
 Nomination - Best Director - Park Jin-pyo
 Nomination - Best Supporting Actress - Na Moon-hee

2006 Baeksang Arts Awards
 Nomination - Best Director - Park Jin-pyo
 Nomination - Best Actor - Hwang Jung-min
 Nomination - Best Actress - Jeon Do-yeon

2006 Grand Bell Awards
 Best Actress - Jeon Do-yeon
 Nomination - Best Film
 Nomination - Best Director - Park Jin-pyo
 Nomination - Best Actor - Hwang Jung-min
 Nomination - Best Supporting Actress - Na Moon-hee

See also
 Ticket Dabang

References

External links 
  
 
 
 

2005 films
2005 romantic drama films
South Korean romantic drama films
HIV/AIDS in film
Films about prostitution in South Korea
Films directed by Park Jin-pyo
CJ Entertainment films
2000s Korean-language films
2005 drama films
2000s South Korean films